The 2013–14 Abilene Christian Wildcats men's basketball team represented Abilene Christian University during the 2013–14 NCAA Division I men's basketball season. The Wildcats were led by third year head coach Joe Golding and played their home games at the Moody Coliseum. They were new members of the Southland Conference. Since this was the first year of a 4-year transition phase from DII to DI, Abilene Christian could participate in the Southland Tournament, and played each conference foe only once, with the exception of Incarnate Word. They finished the season 11–20, 2–12 in Southland play to finish in 12th place.

Roster

Schedule
Source

|-
!colspan=9 style="" | Regular Season

References

Abilene Christian Wildcats men's basketball seasons
Abilene Christian
Abilene Christian Wildcats basketball
Abilene Christian Wildcats basketball